Orekhovskaya is a rural locality (a village) in Nizhnekuloyskoye Rural Settlement, Verkhovazhsky District, Vologda Oblast, Russia. The population was 96 as of 2002. There are 7 streets.

Geography 
Orekhovskaya is located 39 km east of Verkhovazhye (the district's administrative centre) by road. Bosyginskaya is the nearest rural locality.

References 

Rural localities in Verkhovazhsky District